Anna Dlasková (born 6 October 1995) is a Czech football defender, currently playing for Sparta Praha in the Czech Women's First League.

She is a member of the Czech national team. Dlasková made her debut for the national team in a match against Poland on 22 June 2013.

International goals
Statistics accurate as of match played 15 Nov 2022.

References

External links
 
 
 

1995 births
Living people
Czech women's footballers
Czech Republic women's international footballers
Sportspeople from Mladá Boleslav
Women's association football defenders
AC Sparta Praha (women) players
Czech Women's First League players